Shapamoksham is a 1974 Indian Malayalam film, directed by Jesey and produced by Cartoonist Thomas. The film stars Jayan, Sheela, Adoor Bhasi and Jose Prakash in the lead roles. The film had musical score by G. Devarajan.

Cast

Jayan
Sheela
Adoor Bhasi
Jose Prakash
Prasad
Sreelatha Namboothiri
Bahadoor
Bindu Ramakrishnan
K. P. Ummer
Kuthiravattam Pappu
Rani Chandra
Sujatha

Soundtrack
The music was composed by G. Devarajan and the lyrics were written by P. Bhaskaran.

References

External links
 

1974 films
1970s Malayalam-language films
Films directed by Jeassy